The Lacey Street Theatre building, now hosting the Fairbanks Ice Museum, is an Art Deco architectural showpiece theatre located at 500 Second Avenue in Fairbanks, Alaska. It was designed by noted theatre designer B. Marcus Priteca, and built in 1939 by C.W. Hufeisen for Austin E. "Cap" Lathrop. It was one of a chain of movie theaters built by Lathrop across Alaska, and was one of only two in Fairbanks into the 1960s. It closed in 1981, and was repurposed to house the museum in 1992.

The building was listed on the National Register of Historic Places in 1990.

The actual museum, devoted to the display of ice sculpture, offers a daily multimedia presentations, demonstrations of ice carving, and tours of its sculpture collection.

See also
National Register of Historic Places listings in Fairbanks North Star Borough, Alaska

References

External links
Fairbanks Ice Museum web site

Theatres on the National Register of Historic Places in Alaska
Art Deco architecture in Alaska
Buildings and structures in Fairbanks, Alaska
Theatres in Alaska
Museums in Fairbanks, Alaska
Buildings and structures on the National Register of Historic Places in Fairbanks North Star Borough, Alaska

Theatres completed in 1939